Thomas Albert Blondin (October 15, 1910 – December 15, 1978) was an American football player. He played college football at West Virginia Wesleyan and professional football in the National Football League (NFL) as a guard for the Cincinnati Reds. 

Blondin was born in 1910 in Marietta, Ohio. He attended Williamstown High School in Williamstown, West Virginia. He played college football at West Virginia Wesleyan from 1929 to 1932. He was named in 1932 as a first-team guard on multiple All-West Virginia college football teams, including the team selected by the United Press. He was also invited to participate in the 1932 North-South football all-star game.

During the 1933 season, he played in the NFL for the Cincinnati Reds. He was moved from the guard position to end in mid-October 1933.

He died in 1978 in Parkersburg, West Virginia.

References

1910 births
1978 deaths
West Virginia Wesleyan Bobcats football players
Cincinnati Reds (NFL) players
Players of American football from Ohio